1980 Kabul protests may refer to:
 3 Hoot uprising (February)
 1980 student protests in Kabul (April to June)